Absolution Tour is a live video album by English alternative rock band Muse. Released on 12 December 2005, the DVD release documents the band's performance at the 2004 Glastonbury Festival. It also features additional live performances of other Muse songs in the "extras" section.

Track listing
Glastonbury Festival 2004
"Hysteria" – 4:12
"New Born" – 6:29
"Sing for Absolution" – 4:55
"Muscle Museum" – 5:06
"Apocalypse Please" – 4:42
"Ruled by Secrecy" – 4:57
"Sunburn" – 5:32
"Butterflies and Hurricanes" – 6:11
"Bliss" – 3:53
"Time Is Running Out" – 4:02
"Plug In Baby" – 5:02
"Blackout" – 4:24
Extra features
"Fury" (Live at Wiltern Theatre - Los Angeles - 2004) – 4:58
"The Small Print" (Live at Earls Court - London - 2004) – 3:40
"Stockholm Syndrome" (Live at Earls Court - London - 2004) – 7:15
"The Groove in the States" (Live at Top Cats - Cincinnati - 2004) – 9:52
"Thoughts of a Dying Atheist" (Live at Wembley Arena - London - 2003) – 3:15
"Endlessly" (Live at Wembley Arena - London - 2003) – 4:01

Notes
"Citizen Erased" and "Stockholm Syndrome" were performed during the bands set at Glastonbury 2004, but both were omitted from the DVD release.
"Thoughts of a Dying Atheist" and "Endlessly" are hidden tracks on the DVD. To access them, when in the extras menu, go down to 'Stockholm Syndrome', press the left button and the 'X' in 'Extras' should light up, press play and they will play.

Sales and certifications

References

External links
Muse official website
Absolution Tour (DVD) on Musewiki

2005 video albums
Live video albums
Muse (band) video albums
2005 live albums